Ankie Stork (c. 1922 – November 23, 2015) was a Dutch resistance fighter during the German occupation of the Netherlands. She is credited with saving thirty-five Jewish children from the Nazis by hiding them around the town of Nijverdal during World War II. Other prominent members of the group included the publisher, Geert Lubberhuizen.

Stork, a member of the Hengelose manufacturing family, was the daughter of Johan Charles Stork, the director of the Koninklijke Stoombleekerij in Nijverdal.

She became a lecturer and spokesperson after the war. She continued to reside at two residences in Enschede and The Hague until shortly before her death. She died in Enschede on November 23, 2015, at the age of 93.

References

External links 
 

2015 deaths
Dutch resistance members
Dutch people of World War II
Women in war in the Netherlands
People from Enschede
People from The Hague
Year of birth uncertain
20th-century Dutch women